Country Garden is a property development company based in Guangdong, China, owned by Yang Guoqiang's family. In 2020, it is ranked 147th in Fortune Global 500 List. Country Garden features a market capitalization of over US$29.84 billion as of 2018; with 187 high-end township developments throughout China, Malaysia and Australia among its vast international project portfolio. The company is incorporated in Cayman Islands.

Its headquarters are in Beijiao Town (北滘镇), Shunde District, Foshan.

History
Established in 1992 in Shunde, Guangdong, Country Garden was listed on the Hong Kong Stock Exchange on April 20, 2007. Founder Yang Guoqiang built the company from scratch, having previously worked as a farmer and on construction sites. The company now has interests in property development, construction, fitting and decoration, property management and hotel operations in a wide variety of global markets.

In 2005, Yang transferred his shares in Country Garden Holdings Company Limited to his daughter, Yang Huiyan.  In October 2007, she was declared the richest woman in Asia by Forbes magazine, with a net worth of US$16 billion.

In 2014, Country Garden was ranked the 6th largest property developer in China by sales revenue.

On April 2, 2015, Chinese insurance giant Ping An became the second largest shareholder in Country Garden by acquiring 9.9% of the company for US$800 million.

In February 2020, in response to the COVID-19 pandemic, the Sydney office of a Country Garden subsidiary, Risland Australia, sourced 82 tonnes of supplies, which were subsequently airlifted to Wuhan. This daigou operation has caused concern in Australia.

International developments
Country Garden's first venture outside of China is the Country Garden Danga Bay (CGDB) coastal development in Johor Bahru, Iskandar Malaysia, with a sales figure of US$1.57 billion (MYR5.0 billion) on the day of its official launch. Similarly, its second Malaysian project in Semenyih, Selangor termed Country Garden Diamond City had 70% of its total units for Phase 1 sold in early June 2014.

'Risland Australia', Country Garden's overseas venture in Sydney also garnered strong sales, with 296 apartments at its Ryde Garden development sold within six hours in late June 2014; generating US$169 million (AUD180 million) in the process.

Controversy
In Jun 2018, Country Garden halted all projects in China for security inspections following an accident at its construction site in the eastern province of Anhui that killed six people.

In Aug 2018, Malaysia's Prime Minister Mahathir Mohamad reportedly said he intends to ban foreigners from buying homes being built by Country Garden in the southern tip of the country.

In October 2019, Country Garden, via Walker Corporation, was given approval to develop stage one of South East Wilton in Sydney Australia. This is controversial because the eastern side of the site will cut Koala corridors along Allens Creek. The Greater Macarthur area, of which South East Wilton is the most southern section, is home to the largest recovering Koala colony in New South Wales.

See also
Real estate in China

Notes

External links
 

Official Website Of Country Garden(GB)
Official Website Of Country Garden Danga Bay(GB)

Companies listed on the Hong Kong Stock Exchange
Real estate companies of China
Privately held companies of China
Companies based in Foshan
Shunde District